Music Inspired by Illumination & Dr. Seuss' The Grinch is an extended play (EP) by American rapper, Tyler, the Creator. It was released by Columbia Records on November 16, 2018.

Background
For The Grinch soundtrack, Tyler, the Creator created a new song "I Am the Grinch", and also created a hip hop cover version of the song "You're a Mean One, Mr. Grinch". Tyler commented that "making christmas themed music, but not making it too xmasy was the goal [and] keeping 7 year olds in mind but also wanting the parents to listen also".

Track listing
Credits adapted from Tidal.

All tracks were produced and composed by Tyler, the Creator.

References

2018 debut EPs
Albums produced by Tyler, the Creator
Tyler, the Creator albums
Columbia Records albums
2018 Christmas albums
Christmas albums by American artists
Christmas EPs
Columbia Records Christmas albums
The Grinch (franchise)